Guillermo Sotelo (born 1 January 1991) is an Argentine professional footballer who plays as a left-back for Finnish club HIFK.

Career
Sotelo began in the youth ranks of Atlético y Tiro, before spending time with the academies of Renato Cesarini, Alianza Sport Rosario, San Lorenzo and Huracán; who gave Sotelo his start in senior football. He made his debut in Primera B Nacional during a 1–1 draw with Atlético Tucumán on 22 October 2012, prior to netting his first goal in the following November against Douglas Haig. Another goal versus Aldosivi arrived in 2012–13, as the left-back featured twenty-six times in all competitions. His third season ended with promotion to the Primera División. His top-flight bow came in a loss to Godoy Cruz in early 2015.

Before departing Eduardo Domínguez's team in 2016, Sotelo was sent off in his final game for Huracán; against Racing Club in April 2015. In January 2016, Primera B Nacional side Crucero del Norte loaned Sotelo. He remained for three years, having been signed permanently six months into his loan contract, with the Garupá team, the last two of which were spent in Torneo Federal A after they suffered relegation in 2016–17. He made a total of eighty-nine appearances for Crucero del Norte, whilst scoring nine times and also receiving three red cards. On 20 January 2019, Sotelo joined Sarmiento of the tier two.

On 6 July 2020, after spending the 2019–20 campaign with Brown, Sotelo headed to Finnish football with Ykkönen side FF Jaro. His first appearance arrived on 26 July against MYPA, which preceded him subsequently netting his first goal for Jaro against the same opponents on 20 September. He scored again in his penultimate match for the club versus MuSa on 31 October, as they eventually missed out on the promotion play-offs by six points. in February 2021 Sotelo returned to Finland to play in FF Jaro again.

Career statistics
.

Honours
Huracán
Copa Argentina: 2013–14

References

External links

1991 births
Living people
Argentine footballers
Argentine expatriate footballers
People from Reconquista, Santa Fe
Association football defenders
Sportspeople from Santa Fe Province
Primera Nacional players
Argentine Primera División players
Torneo Federal A players
Ykkönen players
Club Atlético Huracán footballers
Crucero del Norte footballers
Club Atlético Sarmiento footballers
Club Atlético Brown footballers
FF Jaro players
Expatriate footballers in Finland
Argentine expatriate sportspeople in Finland